Feigin (Feygin, Feigins, Fejgin, Faygin) is a Jewish surname. It is a matronymic surname derived from the Yiddish female name Feig, Feige, Feiga. It may refer to:

 Alexandra Feigin (born 2002), Bulgarian figure skater
 Anatol Fejgin (1909–2002), Polish communist
 Andrzej Krzysztof Wróblewski born Fejgin (1935–2012), Polish journalist
 Dov Feigin, (1907–2000), Israeli sculptor
 Leo Feigin, also known as Aleksei Leonidov, disk jockey and musical producer, founder of Leo Records
 Mark Feygin, (born 1971), Russian human rights activist
 Moisey Feigin, (1904–2008), Russian artist
 Movsas Feigins, (1908–1950), Latvian chess master

See also
 Fagin, a fictional antisemitic character who appears in the Charles Dickens novel Oliver Twist

Jewish surnames
Matronymic surnames
Yiddish-language surnames